Aaron Elton Pointer (born April 19, 1942) is an American retired professional baseball player. After his baseball career, he was a National Football League official. He is also known for being the brother of the four sisters who form the Pointer Sisters singing group.

Biography

Early life 
Pointer is the eldest of six children of Rev. Elton and Sarah Elizabeth Pointer, pastors at the West Oakland Church of God. He is the older brother of Fritz Pointer, a college professor and author, and older brother of Ruth, Anita, Bonnie, and June Pointer of the Pointer Sisters.

Aaron Pointer grew up in West Oakland, California, and attended McClymonds High School, where he became student body president. At McCymonds, Pointer was active in sports.  Along with two future NBA players, Paul Silas (Pointer's cousin) and Joe Ellis, he played with McClymonds High's unbeaten 1959–60 team. He went to the University of San Francisco on a full basketball scholarship. At USF, he met his wife, Leona.

Baseball career 

In 1961, Pointer signed with Houston, a National League expansion team set to begin major league play the following season. In his debut 1961 campaign, Pointer became the last player to bat over .400 in a full summer season of organized professional baseball in the United States and Canada (although several players have since done so in Mexico.) Playing in 93 games for the Class D Salisbury Braves of the Western Carolinas League and four games for the Triple-A Houston Buffs of the American Association, he batted .402 with 132 total hits. He led the Western Carolinas circuit in runs and batting average, and was named Most Valuable Player and an All-Star. 

Pointer made his debut in the major leagues during the last week of the  season, appearing in two games for the Colt .45s, then spent the entirety of the 1964 and 1965 seasons in Houston's minor league system, as well as most of the 1966 and 1967 seasons. Over three seasons, Pointer had a .208 batting average with two home runs and 15 runs batted in. He was traded to the Chicago Cubs during the 1968 season, but never made it back to the major leagues. He played for the Triple-A Tacoma Cubs in 1968 and 1969, and signed with the Nishitetsu Lions in Fukuoka, Japan after the 1969 season. Pointer played three seasons in Japan from 1970 to 1972. He also played in Venezuela before retiring.

After baseball 
After retiring from baseball, Pointer settled in Tacoma, Washington, in 1973 and worked for Pierce County Parks and Recreation, scheduling and supervising athletic activities. He began officiating football games at the recreational level and later at the high school and college level.

From 1978 to 1987, Pointer officiated for the Pacific-10 Conference, eventually becoming a head linesman. He is also the first African American referee in the Pac-10. In 1987, Pointer joined the National Football League as a head linesman wearing uniform number 79. He retired from the NFL after the 2003 season, but he continues to serve as a game-day observer for the NFL. He once worked a game in Los Angeles where his sisters sang the national anthem before kickoff.

Pointer retired from Pierce County Parks and Recreation in 2000 after 29 years.  He currently serves as president of the Metropolitan Park District of Tacoma board of commissioners, after being appointed to fill a vacancy in 2001. He also serves on the Executive Board of the Tacoma Athletic Commission.

In June 2008, Pointer was inducted into the Tacoma Hall of Fame.

References

External links 

Aaron Pointer at Baseball Almanac
Aaron Pointer at (Venezuelan Professional Baseball League)
Aaron Pointer Sportsmanship Award at Pierce County Parks and Recreation

1942 births
20th-century African-American sportspeople
Living people
21st-century African-American people
African-American baseball players
Amarillo Sonics players
American expatriate baseball players in Japan
Baseball players from Arkansas
Baseball players from Oakland, California
Baseball players from Tacoma, Washington
Durham Bulls players
Estrellas Orientales (VPBL) players
Houston Astros players
Houston Buffs players
Houston Colt .45s players
Industriales de Valencia players
Major League Baseball outfielders
Nishitetsu Lions players
Oklahoma City 89ers players
Aaron
Salisbury Braves players
San Francisco Dons baseball players
San Francisco Dons men's basketball players
San Antonio Bullets players
Sportspeople from Little Rock, Arkansas
Tacoma Cubs players